Michael A. Goorjian (born February 4, 1971) is an American actor, filmmaker, and writer. Goorjian won an Emmy Award for Outstanding Supporting Actor in a Miniseries or Special for his role as David Goodson in the television film David's Mother (1994). He is also known for his role as Justin, Neve Campbell’s love interest on the series Party of Five (1994–2000), as well as Heroin Bob in the film SLC Punk! (1998) and its sequel, Punk's Dead (2016). As a director, Goorjian achieved recognition for his first major independent film, Illusion (2004), which he wrote, directed and starred in alongside Hollywood legend Kirk Douglas.

Biography

Acting
Goorjian was born and raised in the San Francisco Bay Area. His father Peter is Armenian and his paternal grandparents were survivors of the Armenian genocide, while his mother Sarah is of Scottish American descent. Goorjian grew up in Oakland, and attended Bishop O'Dowd High School, which had a strong drama program. At the age of 14 he decided to audition for a local theatre company thinking it was a ‘cool way’ to skip class. After landing the lead role in a 'not-so-cool' play called Computer Crazy, Goorjian soon found out that the rest of the cast were all senior citizens and that he would have to perform the play at his own junior high. Despite this rather humiliating experience, Goorjian stuck with acting and eventually trained at UCLA School of Theatre, Film and Television.

Goorjian won an Emmy Award for Outstanding Supporting Actor in a Miniseries or Special in the TV movie David's Mother starring Kirstie Alley. Ray Loynd commented that Goorjian contributed "a wealth of physical and emotional detail that underscores the familial havoc".

Goorjian’s first big Hollywood break came as a dancer when in 1992 he was cast as Skittery in the Disney film Newsies starring Christian Bale and Robert Duvall. What followed was roles in numerous films including Chaplin with Robert Downey Jr., Forever Young with Mel Gibson, the Oscar-nominated Leaving Las Vegas, Hard Rain with Morgan Freeman and Christian Slater, SLC Punk!, The Invisibles with Portia de Rossi, Broken with Heather Graham and Conversations with God.

Goorjian also guest starred in a number of television series including Lie to Me, House, Alias, Monk, CSI: Crime Scene Investigation, Without A Trace, Chicago Hope as well as a recurring role on Life Goes On as Ray Nelson. He also appeared in the 2005 TV film Reefer Madness, a satirical musical adaptation of the anti-marijuana film from the 1930s.

Theater
Goorjian is a founding member of the Los Angeles-based theater group, Buffalo Nights, and starred in the West Coast premiere of Dennis McIntyre’s drama Modigliani, which won him a L.A. Weekly Theater Award nomination for Best Lead Actor. He played the title roles in both productions of The Apollo of Bellac by Jean Giraudoux, and J.B. by Archibald MacLeish. Goorjian also won a LA Critics Choice and a Garland Backstage West awards for his original choreography for the L.A. production of the musical Reefer Madness.

Director
Goorjian made his first real foray into directing with the mock-documentary Oakland Underground, a comedy about an underground occult music scene in Oakland, CA. From there, Goorjian made Illusion with Kirk Douglas, which was released theatrically in 2006 after racking up over a dozen festival awards, including Best Screenplay at The Hampton’s International Film Festival, Best Feature at the Lake Tahoe International Film Festival and The Audience Award at the Sonoma International Film Festival. With Illusion Goorjian was critically lauded for his ability to blend great filmmaking with philosophical depth. Soon after Illusion, Goorjian began collaborating with the publishing company Hay House to produce and direct a number of films including the documentary You Can Heal Your Life (2007), starring metaphysical author and teacher, Louise L. Hay and The Shift, starring author Dr. Wayne Dyer, along with Michael DeLuise and Portia de Rossi. His most recent work with Hay House is an original film anthology called Tales of Everyday Magic, which explores meaningful philosophical ideas through intimate character-driven stories.

Additional directing credits include the short film Players’ Club, which swept the 2006 Elevate Film Festival in Los Angeles, including Best Director and The War Prayer, an adaptation of Mark Twain’s short story by the same title starring Jeremy Sisto. Occasionally, Goorjian also moonlights directing a circus/cabaret show in Eastern Europe called Palazzo.

Writing
Goorjian debuted as a novelist with his work What Lies Beyond the Stars, the first book in an intended trilogy commissioned by Hay House Publishing. The second book in the series, Beyond the Fractured Sky, will be released in the fall of 2018.

Filmography

Actor

Film

Television

Director
Blood Drips Heavily on Newsies Square (1991) (Short video)
Oakland Underground (1997)
Call Waiting (1998) (Short film)
Illusion (2004)
Players' Club (2006) (Short video)
The War Prayer (2007) (Short film)
You Can Heal Your Life (2007) (Documentary)
The Shift (2009) (Direct-to-DVD)
Entanglement (2012) (Television film)
The Magic Hand of Chance (2012)
Tales of Everyday Magic (2012)
Painting the Future (2012)
My Greatest Teacher (2012)

Writer
Oakland Underground (1997)
The Mesmerist (2002)
Illusion (2004)
Tales of Everyday Magic (2012)
My Greatest Teacher (2012)

Producer
Oakland Underground (1997)
The Invisibles (1999)
Part Time Fabulous (2011)

References

External links
 
 
 Blood Drips On Newsies Square
 The Face and the Voice: Michael Goorjian

1971 births
Living people
American male film actors
American people of Armenian descent
Male actors from Oakland, California
American film directors
American male screenwriters
Screenwriters from California
Outstanding Performance by a Supporting Actor in a Miniseries or Movie Primetime Emmy Award winners